Frullania intermedia is a liverwort species in the genus Frullania.

Subspecies
Frullania intermedia subsp. (Intermedia 1980) F. Billardieriana (Nees & Montagne In Montagne) Verdoorn, 1930
Frullania intermedia subsp. (Intermedia 1980) var. non-Apiculata Hattori, 1975
Frullania intermedia subsp. (Intermedia) (Reinwardt, Blume & Nees) Nees In G., L. & N., 1845
Frullania intermedia subsp. morokensis (Stephani) Hattori, 1980

Frullaniaceae